Shadow Moon is a fantasy novel written by Chris Claremont and George Lucas. Published in 1995, it was the continuation of the 1988 motion picture Willow. This is the first book of the Chronicles of the Shadow War trilogy, followed by Shadow Dawn and Shadow Star.

Plot
One year after the defeat of Queen Bavmorda, Willow Ufgood continues his life as a farmer while honing his sorcery. One night, he dreams of riding on the back of a dragon named Calan Dineer to Tir Asleen. There, he reunites with Madmartigan and Sorsha, who re-name him "Thorn Drumheller". In honor of Elora Danan's first birthday, he gifts her a stuffed bear which transfers a portion of his magical power to her. When he awakens, he discovers an apocalyptic cataclysm has wiped out several areas of the world, including Tir Asleen, killing Madmartigan and Sorsha. The High Aldwyn urges him to leave Nelwyn Vale and investigate the cause of this destruction.

Twelve years later, Willow - now going by Thorn Drumheller - searches the land with brownies Rool and Franjean. The trio are attacked by a pack of Death Dogs, whom they ward off with the help of Geryn Havilhand, a Daikini trooper from Angwyn. The group are joined by ship captains Morag and Maulroon. The latter, Geryn's companion, informs Thorn that they must journey back to Angwyn in honor of Elora Danan's ascension to the throne on her thirteenth birthday. They muse whether Willow Ufgood, Elora's godfather, will be present. Thorn, not revealing his identity, agrees to travel with them to the city.

Upon arrival, the group is told by Castellan Mohdri, leader of Angwyn's Thunder Riders, that Willow is already in Angwyn. Believed to be an impostor, Thorn is thrown into a city dungeon. There, he meets a demon who proposes helping Thorn escape if he helps implant the consciousness of his offspring into the body of a comatose Daikini. Thorn reluctantly agrees, and the demon's offspring - Khory Bannefin - is re-born into the body. Thorn re-unites with Elora, now a spoiled, disagreeable child, at her coronation ceremony, where one ruler representing each of the twelve Realms is present. Thorn fights the Deceiver-Willow, whom he dubs "The Deceiver". The skirmish results in the city being encased in ice. Thorn and Elora flee with Geryn, Khory, Morag, Maulroon and the Brownies. Mohdri and his second-in-command, Anakerie, vow to capture the fugitives.

Thorn tries unsuccessfully to bond with Elora, who believes the Deceiver-Willow was her true Godfather. The group are captured by a cluster of Thunder Riders, who hold them captive while they await Mohdri's arrival. The group are rescued by Ryn, a Wyr ship captain who Thorn also met en route to Angwyn. Believing that Elora is the key to defeating The Deceiver, who likely caused the cataclysm, Thorn insists they travel to the Fairy Lands to converse with Cherlindrea, who gifted him his wand thirteen years ago. The group set sail on an Angwyn ship captained by Maulroon and Morag. A violent storm ravages the ship, killing Morag, but Elora staves it off. 

The group reach the Fairy Lands, but find that magic is unsafe, as it acts as a beacon for The Deceiver to track the group. The Deceiver sends an army of Fire Drakes to kill Thorn's allies, but Elora fights them off, proving her magical abilities. A dying Stag Lord informs Thorn that he must pay for what he's started, and that since Elora stopped fire, the world may be re-born in ice. Mohdri, Anakerie and the Thunder Riders arrive. Geryn reveals that he's an ally to Mohdri, and joins the other side in pursuing Thorn, Elora, Khory, Ryn and the Brownies to a dormant volcano near Doumhall. 

The Deceiver catches up and attempts to implant his soul into Elora's body, but is turned to stone by Thorn. He and his allies flee to higher in the volcano, leaving The Deceiver to escape into the body of Mohdri. The Deceiver-Mohdri confronts Thorn's allies, along with Anakerie, and fights the group. Thorn uses his magic to reach out to the volcano, which recognizes The Deceiver as its enemy and transforms into an active one. Bastian and Anele, Thorn's eagles, help Thorn and Elora ward off the Deceiver-Mohdri, while Geryn sacrifices himself as a show of loyalty to the Castellan. 

In the aftermath, Elora, knowing now Thorn is the true Willow, deduces that the bear he gifted her twelve years ago protected her from the Cataclysm. Declaring that a "Shadow War" has now begun, Thorn expresses hope that he and Elora will receive new allies who can aid in their fight against The Deceiver.

Reception

RPGnet's reviewer described Shadow Moon as "good, solid and in part confusing as hell. Claremont and Lucas pack the details in and ratchet up the drama with unbelievable stunts and rescues."

In 2019–20, Shadow Moon featured on the podcast series 372 Pages We'll Never Get Back, which reads literature of low quality. The two hosts, Conor Lastowka and Michael J. Nelson, described it as the worst book they had read so far, even worse than Sean Penn's Bob Honey Who Just Do Stuff.

Notes

References

1995 American novels
Books by Chris Claremont
American fantasy novels
English-language novels
Works by George Lucas
Collaborative novels
Sequel novels
Willow (film)
Bantam Spectra books